Cornelius Olatunji Adebayo is a former Senator of Nigeria, who became a state governor, and later was head of the Nigerian Federal Ministry of Communications.

Background

Cornelius Olatunji Adebayo was born on February 24, 1941, in Igbaja in Kwara State. He was educated at all Saints Anglican School, Oke-Onigbin, Provincial Secondary School, Ilorin and then at Barewa College, Zaria from 1962-1963. He became a lecturer at the University of Ife in 1969, and in 1973 was appointed head of the English Department at Kwara State College of Technology. Between 1975 and 1978 he was Commissioner for Education and later Commissioner for Information and Economic Development in Kwara State.

Early political career

When the reforms instituted by the military ruler Lt. Gen. Olusegun Obasanjo led to democratic elections for the second republic in 1979, Adebayo was elected as a Senator of the Federal Republic of Nigeria running for the Unity Party of Nigeria. In 1983 he was elected governor of Kwara state, but lost the position on December 31, 1983, when the military overthrow led by Major General Muhammadu Buhari took control.

In 1993 Adebayo was offered a ministerial office by the military regime of General Sani Abacha, but turned it down. 
After a May 31, 1995, bomb explosion in Ilorin, capital of Kwara State, the police arrested and interrogated Adebayo and other members of the National Democratic Coalition, a group that called for the return of democracy during the military regime of General Sani Abacha. 
In 1996, after finding he was scheduled to be arrested again, he fled the country in disguise for a brief exile in Canada.

Obasanjo period

In June 2003, president Obasanjo nominated Adebayo for a ministerial post.
As minister of Communications, Corlenius Adebayo said his colleagues should not be carried away by fantastic returns that had been reported by the mobile phone company MTN Nigeria. He described the need to grant incentives to telecommunications service providers, and spoke with approval of plans by Multi-Links Communications Nigeria to expand its switch capacity to 500,000 lines.
In September 2005 he was a keynote speaker at the 4th International Nigerian Telecommunications Summit in Abuja.

Adebayo pushed for privatization of NITEL, the state telecommunications company. 
In September 2005 he said the sale of a controlling stake in NITEL would be completed by the end of the year. Bidders included Vodacom and MTN Group of South Africa, Huawei Technologies, Orascom Telecom of Egypt and Celtel International.
In April 2006, Mtel, the Mobile subsidiary of NITEL, announced plans to add 2.5 million lines of capacity. The Board of Mtel, chaired by Cornelius Adebayo, had approved the program in September 2005. The vendors were Ericsson, Huawei, ZTE, Motorola, Nokia and Siemens.
A local company founded in 2005, Transnational Corporation of Nigeria, acquired NITEL on July 3, 2006.

In September 2006, Cornelius Adebayo became Minister of Works, replacing Engineer Obafemi Anibaba.

Subsequent career

In 2007, a Munich Court found Siemens AG guilty of misconduct and unethical contract dealings by allegedly offering bribes to Cornelius Adebayo and others to secure contracts for telecommunications equipment.
According to court papers, former ministers Bello Mohammed, Tajudeen Olarenwaju, Cornelius Adebayo and Alhaji Elewi were paid over $17 million as bribes to secure contracts.
In November 2007 President Umaru Yar'Adua ordered security agencies to investigate and prosecute the named officials. 
The Independent Corrupt Practices Commission (ICPC) invited Adebayo for questioning related to involvement in the Siemens bribe scandal during his spell as communication minister.

References

Living people
1941 births
Communication ministers of Nigeria
Governors of Kwara State
Transport ministers of Nigeria
National Democratic Coalition (Nigeria) politicians
Ahmadu Bello University alumni
People from Kwara State
Academic staff of Obafemi Awolowo University
University of Ghana alumni
Barewa College alumni